The 2009 Tour de Luxembourg cycling race  was the 69th running of the Tour de Luxembourg. It was won by Fränk Schleck from Luxembourg, the first home rider to win this race in 26 years.

Stages
Key: 
: Leader and eventual winner of General Classification, based on total time.
: Leader and eventual winner of climbers' classification, based on points gained on passing hilltops.
: : Leader and eventual winner of points classification, based on points given for finishing position on each mass start stage.
: Leader and eventual winner of young riders' classification, based on total time, but restricted to riders under 25 at beginning of year.

Prologue
3 June 2009 — Luxembourg - 2.7 km (ITT)

Stage 1
4 June 2009 — Luxembourg > Mondorf-les-Bains - 157 km

Stage 2
5 June 2009 — Schifflange > Differdange - 188 km

Stage 3
6 June 2009 — Wiltz > Diekirch - 185 km

Stage 4
7 June 2009 — Mersch > Luxembourg - 148 km

Jersey progress

References

Tour de Luxembourg
Tour de Luxembourg
Tour de Luxembourg